Plagiocheilus is a genus of flowering plant in the family Asteraceae. It is now classified in tribe Astereae, but used to be placed with the Anthemideae.

 Species
 Plagiocheilus bogotensis (Kunth) Wedd.  - Colombia, Ecuador, Peru
 Plagiocheilus ciliaris Wedd. - Bolivia
 Plagiocheilus frigidus Poepp. & Endl. - Ecuador, Peru
 Plagiocheilus herzogii Beauverd ex Herzog - Bolivia
 Plagiocheilus peduncularis (Kunth) Wedd. - Ecuador
 Plagiocheilus soliviformis DC. - Bolivia
 Plagiocheilus tanacetoides Haenke ex DC. - Paraguay, Argentina
 formerly included
see Chrysanthellum 
 Plagiocheilus erectus Rusby - Chrysanthellum indicum DC.

References

Astereae
Flora of South America
Asteraceae genera
Taxonomy articles created by Polbot